The Dean Vengeance, formerly known as the Dean VMNT, is a custom designed by Dean Guitars for Dave Mustaine. It was designed in cooperation with Mustaine in 2007.  Its design is based on the Jackson King V that Mustaine popularized in the 1990s.

In 2020, Mustaine announced his departure from Dean and joined Gibson Guitars the following year. The guitar was quickly renamed and reintroduced as the "Vengeance."

Limited edition 
Dean produced 150 limited edition VMNTs worldwide signed by Dave Mustaine. The limited edition has a figured maple top and gold hardware on the transparent red and black model, has black hardware on the transparent Amber version, and comes with a custom hard case.

See also
Dean V
Dean Razorback V
Megadeth

References

VMNT